Chelghoum Laïd is a city in Chelghoum Laïd District, Mila Province, Algeria. In 2008 it had a population of 54,495.

the city inhabitants in the recent years is more 12,000.

Chelghoum laid is the biggest city in Mila province. It is known for its fruit and vegetable national market.

Artist of Chelghoum Laïd 
 Houssam Eddine Hafdi

References

Communes of Mila Province